Robert G. Cole Middle and  High School  is the only public middle school and public high school for the Fort Sam Houston Independent School District, and is classified as a 3A school by the UIL. It is named after Medal of Honor recipient Lt. Col. Robert G. Cole, who was born on Fort Sam Houston. As the boundaries of the district are coterminous with the boundaries of Fort Sam Houston, enrollment at Cole is open only to those pupils residing on the installation or nearby Camp Bullis, or transfer students whose parents work at either installation.

Cole has been twice named a National Blue Ribbon School, in 1986-87 and again in 1990-91.  In 2017, the school was rated "Academically Acceptable" by the Texas Education Agency, with a three-star distinction for Academic Achievements in ELA/Reading, Science, and Post-Secondary Readiness.

Athletics
The Robert G. Cole Cougars compete in the following sports:
Baseball,
Basketball,
Cross Country,
Football,
Golf,
Powerlifting,
Soccer,
Softball, Swimming, 
Tennis,
Track and Field, and
Volleyball.

State titles
Boys Basketball - 
1989(3A) 2021(3A)

Notable alumni
 Alan Keyes (1968), American politician.
 Kivuusama Mays former NFL linebacker.
 Shaquille O'Neal former NBA center
 Babette Maxwell founder Military Spouse magazine

References

External links
Fort Sam Houston ISD

High schools in San Antonio
Public high schools in Bexar County, Texas
Joint Base San Antonio